In graph theory, the metric -center problem is a combinatorial optimization problem studied in theoretical computer science. Given  cities with specified distances, one wants to build  warehouses in different cities and minimize the maximum distance of a city to a warehouse. In graph theory, this means finding a set of  vertices for which the largest distance of any point to its closest vertex in the -set is minimum. The vertices must be in a metric space, providing a complete graph that satisfies the triangle inequality.

Formal definition
A set , is provided together with a parameter . The problem can be formally defined as follows: 
For a metric space (d),
	
 Input: a set , and a parameter .
 Output: a set  of  points.
 Goal: Minimize the cost  d(v,)

That is, Every point in a cluster is in distance at most  from its respective center. 

The k-Center Clustering problem can also be defined on a complete undirected graph G = (V, E) as follows:
Given a complete undirected graph G = (V, E) with distances d(vi, vj) ∈ N satisfying the triangle inequality, find a subset C ⊆ V with |C| = k while minimizing:

Computational complexity
In a complete undirected graph G = (V, E), if we sort the edges in non-decreasing order of the distances: d(e1) ≤ d(e2) ≤ … ≤ d(em) and let Gi = (V, Ei), where Ei = {e1, e2, …, ei}. The k-center problem is equivalent to finding the smallest index i such that Gi has a dominating set of size at most k.

Although Dominating Set is NP-complete, the k-center problem remains NP-hard. This is clear, since the optimality of a given feasible solution for the k-center problem can be determined through the Dominating Set reduction only if we know in first place the size of the optimal solution (i.e. the smallest index i such that Gi has a dominating set of size at most k), which is precisely the difficult core of the NP-Hard problems. Although a Turing reduction can get around this issue by trying all values of k.

Approximations

A simple greedy algorithm 
A simple greedy approximation algorithm that achieves an approximation factor of 2 builds  using a farthest-first traversal in k iterations. 
This algorithm simply chooses the point farthest away from the current set of centers in each iteration as the new center. It can be described as follows:

 Pick an arbitrary point  into 
 For every point  compute  from 
Continue this till k centers are found

Running time 
 The ith iteration of choosing the ith center takes  time.
 There are k such iterations.
 Thus, overall the algorithm takes  time.

Proving the approximation factor 
The solution obtained using the simple greedy algorithm is a 2-approximation to the optimal solution. This section focuses on proving this approximation factor.

	Given a set of n points , belonging to a metric space (d), the greedy K-center algorithm computes a set K of k centers, such that K is a 2-approximation to the optimal k-center clustering of V.

i.e.  

This theorem can be proven using two cases as follows,

Case 1: Every cluster of  contains exactly one point of 

 Consider a point 
 Let  be the center it belongs to in 
 Let  be the center of  that is in 
 
 Similarly, 
 By the triangle inequality: 

 Assume, without loss of generality, that  was added later to the center set  by the greedy algorithm, say in ith iteration.
 But since the greedy algorithm always chooses the point furthest away from the current set of centers, we have that and,

Another 2-factor approximation algorithm 
Another algorithm with the same approximation factor takes advantage of the fact that the k-Center problem is equivalent to finding the smallest index i such that Gi has a dominating set of size at most k and computes a maximal independent set of Gi, looking for the smallest index i that has a maximal independent set with a size of at least k.

It is not possible to find an approximation algorithm with an approximation factor of 2 − ε for any ε > 0, unless P = NP.

Furthermore, the distances of all edges in G must satisfy the triangle inequality if the k-center problem is to be approximated within any constant factor, unless P = NP.

Parameterized approximations 
It can be shown that the k-Center problem is W[2]-hard to approximate within a factor of 2 − ε for any ε > 0, when using k as the parameter. This is also true when parameterizing by the doubling dimension (in fact the dimension of a Manhattan metric), unless P=NP. When considering the combined parameter given by k and the doubling dimension, k-Center is still W[1]-hard but it is possible to obtain a parameterized approximation scheme. This is even possible for the variant with vertex capacities, which bound how many vertices can be assigned to an opened center of the solution.

See also
 Traveling salesman problem
 Minimum k-cut
 Dominating set
 Independent set (graph theory)
 Facility location problem

References

Further reading

 

Combinatorial optimization
Computational problems in graph theory
Approximation algorithms
NP-hard problems